Putative methyltransferase NSUN5 is an enzyme that in humans is encoded by the NSUN5 gene.

This gene encodes a protein with similarity to p120 (NOL1), a 120-kDa proliferation-associated nucleolar antigen that is a member of an evolutionarily conserved protein family. This gene is deleted in Williams syndrome, a multisystem developmental disorder caused by the deletion of contiguous genes at 7q11.23. Alternative splicing of this gene results in two transcript variants encoding different isoforms.

References

Further reading